Nanxiang is a station on Line 11 of the Shanghai Metro. It opened on December 31, 2009.

The station has 3 tracks, one island platform, and one side platform. The inner island platform is not in service. Trains heading to either North Jiading or Huaqiao use the outer island platform, whilst trains towards Disney Resort use the side platform. This station utilizes the same platform layout as Zhenru on the same line.

References 
 

Railway stations in Shanghai
Line 11, Shanghai Metro
Shanghai Metro stations in Jiading District
Railway stations in China opened in 2009